Leaders of the World was an electric advertising sign in New York City from 1910 to 1912 and one of the largest such signs in New York City when it was built. It displayed an animated scene of a Roman chariot race along with a text message for the advertiser. The sign began operation on July 19, 1910, and was destroyed in a storm on February 22, 1912.

Construction 

The sign was erected by the Rice Electric Display Company of Dayton, Ohio, on the roof of the Hotel Normandie, on Broadway and 38th Street, near Herald Square, taking approximately 90 days to complete. The first evening of operation was July 19, 1910, at which it "attracted such a crowd that the police had difficulty in keeping the people in check". At the time of its construction, it had ten times as many electric bulbs as the next largest electric sign on Broadway. The sign was constructed off-site and required eight railroad cars to transport the pieces to New York.

At the sign's commissioning, Elwood E. Rice gave a celebration party on the roof of the Marlborough Hotel, two blocks south of the Normandie at 38th street, with a good view of the sign. The party included an orchestra and buffet lunch, and was by invitation only.

Description 

The sign had an animated scene of a Roman chariot race which repeated every 30 seconds. The scene used a series of flashing lights for the chariots, horses, and drivers moving in one direction, and the stadium audience moving in the opposite direction.

In 1911, a contest was held in which people could submit "snappy catch phrases or slogans" that could be used by the sign's advertisers. The contest was publicized in 18 cities including Paris, attracting 500,000 entries that competed for $15,000 in cash prizes.

The incandescent bulbs ranged from 2 to 32 candle power, with another bank of 100W tungsten lamps. Approximately 2750 electrical switches controlled the lights, requiring two  motors to operate the switches. The sign included no moving parts; the appearance of motion was created by lights flashing at high speed. For example, one of the horses had 8 sets of lights outlining various positions of their legs, with the illumination changing quickly enough that the human eye perceived continuous motion.

Destruction in a storm 
The sign was destroyed in a record-setting storm which hit New York on February 22, 1912. The wind broke the sign into two pieces, leaving the upper section dangling, after which the Fire Department issued an order to have the rest of the sign taken down.

Literary allusion 
This Side of Paradise (1920), the debut novel of F. Scott Fitzgerald, references the sign in the first chapter, where protagonist Amory Blaine observes New York City at night for the first time, as lit by the sign:

As the sign was used as a vehicle for advertising in real life, James L. W. West III surmises that this allusion serves to foreshadow Amory's employment at an advertising agency later in the story. After Amory's firing from the agency leads to his loss of wealth and status, his girlfriend Rosalind Connage leaves him for a rich man. West wrote that the theme of "authority of money, its power to subvert genuine love and human feeling" is present in all of Fitzgerald's works, and that the sign in the novel was a symbol for commerce.

References

External links 

 
Advertising structures
History of New York City
1910 establishments in New York City
1912 disestablishments in New York (state)
Broadway (Manhattan)
Midtown Manhattan